NGC 7095 is a barred spiral galaxy located about 115 million light-years away in the constellation of Octans. NGC 7095 was discovered by astronomer John Herschel on September 21, 1837.

References

External links 

Barred spiral galaxies
Octans
7095
67546
Astronomical objects discovered in 1837